Trail Riders is a 1942 American Western film directed by Robert Emmett Tansey. The film is the eighteenth in Monogram Pictures' "Range Busters" series, and it stars John "Dusty" King as Dusty, "Davy" Sharpe and Max "Alibi" Terhune, with Evelyn Finley, Forrest Taylor and Charles King.

The film is also known as Dead Men Don't Ride (American pre-release title).

Cast 
John Dusty King as Dusty King
David Sharpe as Davy Sharpe
Max Terhune as Alibi Terhune
Elmer as Elmer, Alibi's Dummy
Evelyn Finley as Mary Rand
Forrest Taylor as Mike Rand
Charles King as Ed Cole
Kermit Maynard as Henchman Ace Alton
Lynton Brent as Jeff Rand
Jack Curtis as Ranch Hand Tiny
Steve Clark as Marshal Jim Hammond
Kenne Duncan as Marshal Frank Hammond

See also
The Range Busters series:
 The Range Busters (1940)
 Trailing Double Trouble (1940)
 West of Pinto Basin (1940)
 Trail of the Silver Spurs (1941)
 The Kid's Last Ride (1941)
 Tumbledown Ranch in Arizona (1941)
 Wrangler's Roost (1941)
 Fugitive Valley (1941)
 Saddle Mountain Roundup (1941)
 Tonto Basin Outlaws (1941)
 Underground Rustlers (1941)
 Thunder River Feud (1942)
 Rock River Renegades (1942)
 Boot Hill Bandits (1942)
 Texas Trouble Shooters (1942)
 Arizona Stage Coach (1942)
 Texas to Bataan (1942)
 Trail Riders (1942)
 Two Fisted Justice (1943)
 Haunted Ranch (1943)
 Land of Hunted Men (1943)
 Cowboy Commandos (1943)
 Black Market Rustlers (1943)
 Bullets and Saddles (1943)

External links 

1942 films
1940s English-language films
American black-and-white films
Monogram Pictures films
1942 Western (genre) films
American Western (genre) films
Films directed by Robert Emmett Tansey
Range Busters
1940s American films